Mir Shakawat Ali Daru is a Bangladesh Awami League politician. he is elected Members of the National Assembly of Pakistan in 1970, elected Member of Parliament in Undivided Khulna-3 constituency in 1973 and elected Member of Parliament the Bagerhat-2 constituency in June 1996.

Birth and early life 
Mir Sakhawat Ali Daru was born in Bagerhat district of Khulna Division.

Career
Daru was elected Members of the National Assembly of Pakistan in 1970, elected Member of Parliament in Undivided Khulna-3 constituency in 1973 and elected Member of Parliament the Bagerhat-2 constituency in June 1996.

References

External links 
 List of 1st Parliament Members -Jatiya Sangsad (In Bangla)
 List of 7th Parliament Members -Jatiya Sangsad (In Bangla)

Living people
People from Bagerhat District
Awami League politicians
Members of the National Assembly of Pakistan
1st Jatiya Sangsad members
7th Jatiya Sangsad members
Year of birth missing (living people)